Aethes rutilana, the pale juniper webworm, is a moth of the family Tortricidae. It was described by Jacob Hübner in 1817. It is found in the whole of Europe and North America.

The larvae feed on Juniperus communis.

Subspecies
Aethes rutilana rutilana
Aethes rutilana canadiana (Razowski, 1997)
Aethes rutilana tatricana (Adamczewski, 1936)

References

External links

Lepiforum e.V.
Aethes rutilana at Waarneming.nl 

rutilana
Moths described in 1817
Taxa named by Jacob Hübner
Tortricidae of Europe
Moths of North America